Uta Hick's bearded saki (Chiropotes utahicki) is an endangered species of bearded saki, a type of New World monkey. It is endemic to Brazil, where restricted to the Amazon between the Xingu and Tocantins Rivers. It was formerly treated as a subspecies of the more easterly C. satanas, but its back is pale brownish.

Etymology 
It was named in honor of Uta Hick, a German primatologist who cared for bearded sakis at the Cologne Zoo. 
In the 1980s, she was the first person who could successfully keep captive bearded sakis. 
Her married name is Uta Rümpler.

Even though  technically indicates a male honoree, some sources discourage modifying the earlier utahicki, 
because there is no official way to make such corrections under the current (1999) ICZN.

References

Uta Hick's bearded saki
Mammals of Brazil
Endemic fauna of Brazil
Uta Hick's bearded saki
Taxobox binomials not recognized by IUCN
Taxa named by Philip Hershkovitz